Mount Griggs, formerly known as Knife Peak Volcano, is a stratovolcano, which lies 10 km behind the volcanic arc defined by other Katmai group volcanoes. Although no historic eruptions have been reported from Mount Griggs, vigorously active fumaroles persist in a summit crater and along the upper southwest flank. The fumaroles on the southwest flank are the hottest, and some of the flank fumaroles can roar so loudly that they can be heard from the valley floor. The slopes of Mount Griggs are heavily mantled by fallout from the 1912 eruption of Novarupta volcano. The summit consists of three concentric craters, the lowest and largest of which contains a recent summit cone topped by two craters. Isotopic analysis indicates that the source of Griggs' magma is distinct from the other Katmai volcanoes.

The mountain was named for Dr. Robert Fiske Griggs (1881–1962), botanist, whose explorations of the area, after the eruption of Mount Katmai in 1912, led to the creation of Katmai National Monument by President Woodrow Wilson in 1918.



See also

List of mountain peaks of North America
List of mountain peaks of the United States
List of mountain peaks of Alaska
List of Ultras of the United States
List of volcanoes in the United States

References

External links

 Volcanoes of the Alaska Peninsula and Aleutian Islands-Selected Photographs
 Mount Griggs at the Alaska Volcano Observatory
 Mount Griggs at the Smithsonian Global Volcanism Project

Volcanoes of Lake and Peninsula Borough, Alaska
Stratovolcanoes of the United States
Mountains of Alaska
Volcanoes of Alaska
Katmai National Park and Preserve
Aleutian Range
Mountains of Lake and Peninsula Borough, Alaska
Highest points of United States national parks
Pleistocene stratovolcanoes
Holocene stratovolcanoes